Microcrambus niphosella is a moth in the family Crambidae. It was described by George Hampson in 1908. It is found in Trinidad.

References

Crambini
Moths described in 1908
Moths of the Caribbean